John Halsey (born 23 February 1945) is a rock drummer, best known for his appearance in the television film All You Need is Cash (1978) as Barrington Womble ("Barry Wom") of The Rutles. Previous to this he had played with fellow future Rutle Neil Innes's band Fatso and appeared with them in the BBC Television comedy series, Rutland Weekend Television, fronted by a third Rutle, Eric Idle.

Halsey was born in Highgate, North London and grew up in North Finchley. He joined the London rhythm and blues band Felder's Orioles in 1965, who released four singles on the Piccadilly Records label. In 1967 he joined Timebox, a band from Southport, who later became Patto. With record producer Muff Winwood they released three albums. The band disbanded in 1973.

In 1972 Halsey played drums on the Lou Reed album Transformer and recorded as a session musician on albums including Mind Your Own Business by Henry McCullough (1975), Back to the Night by Joan Armatrading (1975), Bullinamingvase by Roy Harper (1977), Woman in the Wings by Maddy Prior (1978), and Mail Order Magic by Roger Chapman (1980). He toured with others including Joe Cocker, The Scaffold, Grimms, Chris Jagger, Neil Innes, Viv Stanshall, and Joe Brown.

In an interview for the magazine Ptolemaic Terrascope in 1992, he said that he spent much of the 1980s selling fish from the back of a van after a near-fatal accident in Chichester in 1983 and that since then, he has been in the pub trade. Since 1996 he has been the landlord of the Castle Inn public house in Castle Street, Cambridge.

He appeared on the Channel 4 show What The Pythons Did Next on 1 January 2007, discussing what it was like to work with Eric Idle. In April 2008 he appeared at the Rutles' thirty-year reunion in Los Angeles, where the four original band members played together again.

References

External links
 

1945 births
Living people
People from Highgate
People from Finchley
Musicians from London
English rock drummers
The Rutles members